Robert, Bobby, Rob or Bob Norris may refer to:

 Robert Norris (sheriff) of Kootenai County, Idaho
 Robert Norris (Vermont politician), member of the Vermont House of Representatives
 Rob Norris, retired Canadian politician
 Robert O. Norris Jr. (1880–1960), American politician
 Bobby Norris (born 1986), English television personality
 Bob Norris (Ghost Whisperer), a fictional character in the television drama Ghost Whisperer
 Robert Norris (footballer) (born 1987), English footballer
 Robert Norris (basketball) (born 1924), British basketball player
 Bob Norris (footballer) (1875–1940), English footballer
 Bobby Norris (racehorse trainer) (1898–1988); see Arkle Challenge Trophy
 Bob Norris (1929–2019), actor who portrayed the Marlboro Man